Trailing of the Sheep is an annual October festival and parade in Sun Valley, Ketchum and Hailey, Idaho.  It is held each fall to move the flocks off the mountain to their winter grazing homes. It is similar to the Almabtrieb in Austria, and is intended as a celebration of the history and tradition of sheep husbandry in the Western United States.

See also
 Grazing

References

External links
Trailing of the Sheep Festival Organization
A Photo Essay
Sheep in popular culture
Agriculture in Idaho
Sheep farming in the United States
bar:Oimotrieb
de:Almabtrieb
fr:Almabtrieb
pl:Redyk
ru:Альмабтриб